Blok may refer to:

Blok (surname)
Blok (comics), the fictional superhero of the DC Comics universe
Blok M, downtown shopping area in Jakarta, Indonesia
Mega Bloks, plastic building blocks produced by Mega Bloks, Incorporated
The Vlaams Blok (Dutch: Vlaams Blok), former Flemish right-wing nationalist political party
Blok (Pendragon series), the all-powerful company in the book The Quillan Games by D. J. MacHale

See also
Block (disambiguation)
Bloch (disambiguation)